Somatidia capillosa is a species of beetle in the family Cerambycidae. It was described by Arthur Sidney Olliff in 1889. It is known from Australia, from Lord Howe Island.

References

capillosa
Beetles described in 1889
Endemic flora of Australia